Dashkesan may refer to:
 Daşkəsən, a town in Azerbaijan
 Daşgəsən, a village in Azerbaijan
 Daşkəsən (settlement), a municipality in Azerbaijan
 Dashkasan District, a district in Azerbaijan
Dashkasan (disambiguation), places in Iran